Applicator Applicators may refer to:
The Applicators, an American pop punk band
A tool to put tubal ligation clips in place
Electron beam collimator component in some devices